Ahora le Toca al Cangri! Live is a live album of the greatest hits by Daddy Yankee released on March 15, 2005 on VI Music. Its songs are based on tracks released before his worldwide hit, Barrio Fino (2004).

Track listing

Charts

References

2005 live albums
Daddy Yankee live albums
Spanish-language live albums